Acestrorhynchus grandoculis is a species of fish in the family Acestrorhynchidae. It was described by Naércio Aquino de Menezes and Jacques Géry in 1983. It inhabits the Amazon, Negro and Orinoco Rivers.

Gallery

References

Acestrorhynchidae
Taxa named by Naércio Aquino de Menezes
Taxa named by Jacques Géry
Fish described in 1983